Title 29 of the United States Code is a code that outlines labor regulations in the United States.

Code Chapters 
Title 29 has 35 chapters:

 : Labor Statistics
 : Women's Bureau 
 . Children's Bureau (Transferred)
 . National Trade Unions (Repealed)
 . Vocational Rehabilitation of Persons Injured in Industry 
 . Employment Stabilization (Omitted or Repealed)
 . Federal Employment Service 
 . Apprentice Labor 
 . Labor Disputes; Mediation and Injunctive Relief 
 . Jurisdiction of Courts in Matters Affecting Employer and Employee 
 : Labor-Management Relations 
 . Fair Labor Standards 
 . Portal-To-Portal Pay 
 . Disclosure of Welfare and Pension Plans (Repealed)
 . Labor-Management Reporting and Disclosure Procedure 
 . Department of Labor 
 . Exemplary Rehabilitation Certificates (Repealed)
 . Age Discrimination in Employment 
 . Occupational Safety and Health
 . Vocational Rehabilitation and Other Rehabilitation Services 
 . Comprehensive Employment and Training Programs (Repealed)
 . Employee Retirement Income Security Program 
 . Job Training Partnership (Repealed, Transferred, or Omitted)
 . Migrant and Seasonal Agricultural Worker Protection 
 . Helen Keller National Center for Youths and Adults Who Are Deaf-Blind 
 . Employee Polygraph Protection 
 . Worker Adjustment and Retraining Notification 
 . Technology Related Assistance for Individuals With Disabilities (Repealed)
 . Displaced Homemakers Self-Sufficiency Assistance (Repealed)
 . National Center for the Workplace (Repealed)
 . Women in Apprenticeship and Nontraditional Occupations 
 . Family and Medical Leave 
 . Workers Technology Skill Development
 . Workforce Investment Systems
 . Assistive Technology For Individuals With Disabilities

References

External links
U.S. Code Title 29, via United States Government Printing Office
U.S. Code Title 29, via Cornell University

29
Title 29